The Fanfreluche Stakes is a thoroughbred horse race run annually during the last week of October at Woodbine Racetrack in Toronto, Ontario, Canada. Restricted to two-year-old fillies foaled in Ontario, it is contested on dirt over a distance of six furlongs.

Inaugurated in 1981, the race is named in honor of J. Louis Lévesque's Hall of Fame filly, Fanfreluche.

Records
Speed  record: 
 1:09.30 - High Mist (2008)

Most wins by an owner:
 3 - Eaton Hall Farm (1989, 2005, 2009)

Most wins by a jockey:
 5 - David Clark (1981, 1983, 1995, 1999, 2007)

Most wins by a trainer:
 4 - Reade Baker (1996, 2000, 2003, 2008)

Winners since 1999

References

Restricted stakes races in Canada
Flat horse races for two-year-old fillies
Recurring sporting events established in 1981
Woodbine Racetrack
1981 establishments in Ontario